Dolomedes albineus, the white-banded fishing spider, is a species of nursery web spider in the family Pisauridae. It is found in the United States. Like most Dolomedes, this spider tends to hunt at or in streams and ponds. It has special hairs that repel water, allowing it to walk on water, and trap an air bubble on its abdomen to dive and swim, so that it can hunt tadpoles and aquatic invertebrates.

References

External links

 

albineus
Articles created by Qbugbot
Spiders described in 1845